Storeria is a genus of snakes in the subfamily Natricinae of the family Colubridae. The genus is endemic to North America and Central America. The genus consists of five species, four of which are known as brown snakes, and the other of which is known as the redbelly snake.

Geographic range
Species in the genus Storeria are found in the eastern half of the United States and southern Canada and range south through Mexico and northern Central America.

Etymology
The genus is named in honor of American physician and naturalist David Humphreys Storer (1804–1891).

Description
As their common names imply, most snakes of the genus Storeria are a variant of brown in color. The brown can vary depending on locale, to be almost a brick red in color, to nearly black. They sometimes have a lighter-colored stripe down the center of the back, and small black blotches along the body, and just behind the head. The underside is usually lighter brown-colored, yellow, or in the case of the redbelly snake, reddish in color. They rarely grow beyond  in total length (including tail).
One of the best means of identification is by scalation. The dorsal scales are keeled, the head has no loreal scale, and the postnasal scale touches the preocular scale.  So, only two scales are between the nasal opening and the eye. Sexually mature males will reach a SVL of 118 mm and females will reach 126 mm.

Ecology
Within their ranges, brown snakes are very commonly found species of snake. They are most frequently found under leaf litter or debris piles, and are sometimes turned up during gardening. They consume a variety of invertebrate prey, including, earthworms, snails and slugs. Their only means of defense are flattening of the body and excretion from the anal scent glands.  Brown snakes give birth to live young.

Species and subspecies
Storeria dekayi (Holbrook, 1836) – brown snake
Storeria dekayi anomala Dugès, 1888
Storeria dekayi dekayi (Holbrook, 1836) – northern brown snake
Storeria dekayi limnetes Anderson, 1961 – marsh brown snake
Storeria dekayi temporalineata Trapido, 1944
Storeria dekayi texana Trapido, 1944 – Texas brown snake
Storeria dekayi tropica Cope, 1885
Storeria dekayi wrightorum Trapido, 1944 – midland brown snake
Storeria hidalgoensis Taylor, 1942 – Mexican yellowbelly brown snake
Storeria occipitomaculata (Storer, 1839) – redbelly snake
Storeria occipitomaculata obscura Trapido, 1944 – Florida redbelly snake
Storeria occipitomaculata occipitomaculata (Storer, 1839) – northern redbelly snake
Storeria occipitomaculata pahasapae H.M. Smith, 1963 – Black Hills redbelly snake
Storeria storerioides (Cope, 1866) – Mexican brown snake
Storeria victa O.P. Hay, 1892 – Florida brown snake

Nota bene: A binomial authority or trinomial authority in parentheses indicates that the species or subspecies was originally described in a genus other than Storeria.

Gallery

References

Further reading
Baird SF, Girard C (1853). Catalogue of North American Reptiles in the Museum of the Smithsonian Institution. Part I.—Serpents. Washington, District of Columbia: Smithsonian Institution. xvi + 172 pp. (Storeria, new genus, p. 135).
Powell R, Conant R, Collins JT (2016). Peterson Field Guide to Reptiles and Amphibians of Eastern and Central North America, Fourth Edition. Boston and New York: Houghton Mifflin Harcourt. xiv + 494 pp., 47 plates, 207 figures. . (Genus Storeria, p. 423, Figure 192).

External links
Brown Snake (Storeria dekayi ) Species account from the Savanna River Ecology Laboratory Herpetology Program (University of Georgia). Accessed April 6, 2014.

Brown Snake - Storeria dekayi Species account from the Iowa Reptile and Amphibian Field Guide.

Storeria
Extant Pleistocene first appearances
Snake genera
Taxa named by Charles Frédéric Girard
Taxa named by Spencer Fullerton Baird